The cultural life of Sydney, Australia is dynamic and multicultural. Many of the individual cultures that make up the Sydney mosaic are centred on the cultural, artistic, ethnic, linguistic and religious communities formed by waves of immigration. Sydney is a major global city with a vibrant scene of musical, theatrical, visual, literary and other artistic activity.

History

Sydney has a long rich cultural history. It is located in the traditional custodian lands of the Gadigal people who originally settled in the area at least 60,000 years ago. After the  arrival of the First Fleet in 1788, a series of cultures emerged and adapted from European and American influences in needs of a modern-class city.

Following the end of World War I, new forms of culture processed a mix of cultural diversity, on bases of ethnicity, age and gender. 

Currently, Sydney endures a vibrant arts scene in distinction to multicultural heritage and provides dozens of institutions, including its world heritage-listed opera house.

Arts and entertainment

Performing arts 

The Sydney Festival, held each year in January, is Sydney's and Australia's biggest performing arts festival, incorporating classical and contemporary music, theatre, visual arts, and new media.

The Sydney Theatre Company shows a regular roster of Australian (by authors such as noted playwright David Williamson), classic, and international plays. Their productions occasionally incorporate the return to the live stage of famous Australian screen actors such as Cate Blanchett, Hugo Weaving, Geoffrey Rush, etc. The Wharf Theatre, the Sydney Theatre, the Drama Theatre of the Opera House and the Belvoir St Theatre (the home of Company B) are some of the main live theatre venues. The Bell Shakespeare Company, directed by John Bell, specializes in Shakespearean drama, with forays into modern plays such as Heiner Müller's 'Titus Andronicus'.

Sydney has several independent theatres for productions throughout the city centre including the Capitol Theatre (est. 1928, 2000 seats), the Lyric Theatre (2000 seats), the Theatre Royal (Est. 1827, 1200 seats) and the State Theatre (est. 1929, 2000 seats but stage not big enough for large productions).

From the 1940s to the 1970s the Sydney Push, an intellectual subculture of authors and activists questioning of authority, including Germaine Greer, was active.

The Sydney Dance Company under the leadership of Graeme Murphy has put on contemporary productions since the late 20th century. The Australian Ballet, whose headquarters are in Melbourne, performs regularly in Sydney.

Every May at the anniversary of the Concordia German Club, which was founded in 1883 and every Christmas the Concordia German Choir performs at the German Club in Tempe. The Choir specializes in German folk songs.

Music 

'O! Sydney I Love You''' was the winner of a song writing competition organized by The Sun newspaper. Emily Harris studio dance recorded the song in 1927. Sydney was recorded by Maurice Chenoweth around the same time. My City of Sydney was performed by Tommy Leonetti on Channel 9 during the 1970s as the station shut down for the evening.

The Sydney Symphony is internationally renowned and regularly performs in the Concert Hall (2,600 seats) of the Sydney Opera House under Chief Conductor Vladimir Ashkenazy (until 2013) and, as of 2014, David Robertson. City Recital Hall is dedicated mainly to chamber music and chamber orchestra concerts, featuring many famous international artists as well as concert series by local groups such as the Australian Chamber Orchestra and Sydney's foremost Baroque orchestra, the Australian Brandenburg Orchestra.

Opera Australia, as at 2015 the world's third-busiest opera company, has its headquarters in Sydney and performs a busy program of mainly classical and occasionally contemporary operas at the Opera Theatre of the Sydney Opera House.

New experimental and avant-garde music is performed by Ensemble Offspring, Halcyon, The Noise and others, at the recently refurbished Carriageworks and many small inner-city cafes, warehouses, theatres etc. Liquid Architecture, What Is Music and The NOW now are annual festivals and ongoing series of contemporary music and sound art.

Jazz and alternative music (such as Sydney-based The Necks) are played at The Basement and Jazz at 72, and formerly at the now defunct Harbourside Brasserie. The Sound Lounge (SIMA), Jazzgroove, 505 and Red Rattler host regular jazz and alternative music events.

Many well-known Australian rock bands and solo artists began their careers in Sydney. Various Sydney inductees into the ARIA Hall of Fame include Johnny O'Keefe, Col Joye (& The Joy Boys), Billy Thorpe (the original Aztecs formed in Sydney), The Easybeats, Sherbet, Richard Clapton, John Paul Young, AC/DC, Radio Birdman, Midnight Oil, Rose Tattoo, Mental As Anything, INXS, Icehouse and Divinyls.

Other notable acts include early rockers Lonnie Lee & the Leemen, Dig Richards & The R'Jays and Johnny Rebb & The Rebels, surf group The Atlantics, beat groups Ray Brown & The Whispers, The Missing Links and The Throb. The 1970s saw "progressive" acts like Tamam Shud, Tully and Blackfeather emerge, followed by glam groups Hush & Ted Mulry Gang.

Sydney is famous for its alternative rock scene, with such names as The Celibate Rifles, indie rockers The Clouds, The Vines and The Crystal Set, to electronic music pioneers Severed Heads, Single Gun Theory, The Lab, Itch-E and Scratch-E and local favourites Sneaky Sound System. Sydney is the original home of the now national alternative rock festival the Big Day Out, which began in Sydney in 1992 featuring local bands such as You Am I and The Clouds and international groups like Nirvana.

Other notable bands from the Sydney music scene are Angelspit, Wolfmother, Thy Art Is Murder, and 5 Seconds of Summer.

Sydney has a prominent indie or lo-fi scene which features many rising, internationally touring bands such as Royal Headache, Circle Pit, Electric Flu and Raw Prawn. While not as widespread as Melbourne's 'scene', Sydney tends to have a mass of tight-knit groups of bands that will tour together, most of which are on the same record label(s).

Film

Sydney is Australia's centre for commercial film and media. Many of the landmarks in Sydney have been referenced, shown and been the setting for countless films and television programs. Many films have been set in the city, including Finding Nemo, which was set in Sydney Harbour. The city was used as downtown Angel Grove in 20th Century Fox's Mighty Morphin Power Rangers: The Movie (1995). The Matrix was also filmed in Sydney.

The international Sydney Film Festival takes place each year in June at various venues in the CBD.

Other film festivals in Sydney include the renowned short film festivals Tropfest and Flickerfest.

 Children's entertainment 
A large portion of Australia's children's entertainment originates in Sydney including highly successful musical groups The Wiggles and Hi-5 and television programs Play School, Bananas in Pyjamas, Saturday Disney, Skippy the Bush Kangaroo, Mr. Squiggle and many others.

 Museums 

Sydney has been home to many visual artists, from the lush pastoralism of Lloyd Rees depictions of Sydney Harbour to Jeffrey Smart's portraits of bleak urban alienation, from the psychedelic visions of Brett Whiteley to a plethora of contemporary artists.

Sydney has a range of museums including those based on visual art such as the Museum of Contemporary Art, the Art Gallery of New South Wales, the White Rabbit Gallery, CarriageWorks, Artspace Sydney, the Brett Whiteley Studio; science and technology such as the Powerhouse Museum, Sydney Observatory, Sydney Tramway Museum, Australian National Maritime Museum and Australian Museum; and history such as the Museum of Sydney.

The Art Gallery of New South Wales (AGNSW), alongside major collections of Australian colonial and 20th-century art and some works by European masters, has the largest and most important collection of Aboriginal art anywhere in the world. The Archibald Prize for portraiture (Australia's most prestigious art prize), the Sulman Prize for subject/genre painting and the Wynne Prize for landscape painting are awarded each year by the trustees of the AGNSW.

The Museum of Contemporary Art (MCA) at West Circular Quay is Australia's foremost contemporary art museum, featuring a mixture of exhibitions from the museum's permanent collection and visiting shows by major international artists. The Biennale of Sydney is an important festival dedicated to the contemporary visual arts, held bi-annually at the MCA and at various other venues around the city and often spilling into the streets. Another visual arts festival held at the MCA each spring is Primavera, a festival focusing on young, up-and-coming Australian artists.

A huge wrap-around mural by renowned American artist Sol LeWitt can be seen in the foyer of Australia Square Tower on the corner of George, Bond and Pitt Streets. Outside the tower, facing George Street, there is a large abstract steel sculpture by American sculptor Alexander Calder.

There are many commercial galleries focusing mainly on cutting-edge contemporary art all around the inner city suburbs of Woollahra, Newtown, Surry Hills, Paddington, Darlinghurst, Camperdown etc.

Graffiti and street art thrive in Sydney. The Newtown, Surry Hills and Glebe areas in particular have many innovative examples of murals and other street art.

A recent addition is Art Month Sydney, a month-long festival of the visual arts held throughout March and the annual Art & About Sydney Festival.

 Literature and libraries 

The Sydney Writers' Festival based in Walsh Bay, is held each year in May, featuring readings and discussions by Australian and international writers. An array of novels have used Sydney as a setting, notably Ruth Park's The Harp in the South, which charts the slums of 1930s–40s Sydney, Christina Stead's Seven Poor Men of Sydney which addresses a similar theme of life in the poor neighbourhoods, and Elizabeth Harrower's Down in the City–set in a King's Cross apartment in the late 1950s. More contemporary examples include Melina Marchetta's Looking for Alibrandi, J. M. Coetzee's Diary of a Bad Year, Peter Carey's 30 Days in Sydney, Patrick White's The Eye of the Storm and Kate Grenville's The Secret River. Prolific writers from the city include Geraldine Brooks, Jackie French, Kathy Lette, Phillip Knightley and Richard Neville.

The largest library in Sydney is the State Library of New South Wales, which holds over 4.7 million items, including 2 million books, and hosts free exhibitions in its gallery spaces. Most local government areas within Sydney have local libraries including the City of Sydney Library with eight local branches, the Bankstown City Library, the Max Webber Library in Blacktown and many others.

 Tourism 

Many of the tourist attractions are scattered all over the city, the most famous and visited being the Sydney Opera House and the Sydney Harbour Bridge. Other attractions include the Royal Botanical Gardens, the Art Gallery of New South Wales, the Museum of Contemporary Art, White Rabbit Gallery and Sydney Tower.

Sydney's nightlife has declined since the introduction of lockout laws, which call for 1.30am lockouts and 3am last drinks. Prior to the introduction of the laws, Kings Cross was known as the city's red-light district. There are huge celebrations for New Year's Eve and Australia Day in Sydney, including a fireworks display that features the Harbour Bridge.

Many festivals are held in Sydney, including the Sydney Festival, a celebration of partly free performances throughout January; Vivid Sydney, a festival of light and music held annually in May–June; the Gay and Lesbian Mardi Gras (see below); the annual Sydney Film Festival and many smaller festivals such as Tropfest.

There are also several music festivals including Big Day Out, Homebake, The Great Escape, and Stereosonic.

 Sport 

Sport is an important part of the culture in Sydney. New South Wales has attracted many international multi-sport events including the 2000 Summer Olympics, held in Sydney. Sydney was also the host of the 1938 British Empire Games. The Olympic Stadium, now known as ANZ Stadium, is the scene of the annual NRL Grand Final. It also regularly hosts rugby league State of Origin as well as rugby union and soccer internationals. It hosted the final of the 2003 Rugby World Cup and the memorable soccer World Cup qualifier between Australia and Uruguay.

The Sydney Cricket Ground traditionally hosts the 'New Year' cricket test match from 2–6 January each year. The annual Sydney to Hobart Yacht Race begins in Sydney Harbour on Boxing Day, whilst the climax of Australia's touring car racing series is the Bathurst 1000, held at the Mount Panorama Circuit near the city of Bathurst in the Western Plains.

The Sydney Autumn Racing Carnival features the richest two-year-old horse race in the world, the Golden Slipper Stakes, which is run in April every year. The Medibank International tennis tournament is held in January prior to the Australian Open. The City to Surf foot race is held every August and is one of the largest timed foot races in the world.

Rugby
Rugby league football has a place with some Sydneysiders, as a sporting and a tradition within the city. This stems back from the earlier colonial days of the city where the city and its cultural were largely dictated by wealthy Englishmen whom traditionally played and were supporters of the Rugby code of football, which was largely advertised and passed on to the people of Sydney, including the working class who in back in England largely played soccer. The game quickly grew a working-class following, and has been a Sydney tradition ever since.

The headquarters of the Australian Rugby League and National Rugby League (NRL) are in Sydney, which is home to nine of the 16 NRL football clubs (Sydney Roosters, South Sydney Rabbitohs, Parramatta Eels, Cronulla Sharks, Wests Tigers, Penrith Panthers, Bulldogs and Manly-Warringah Sea Eagles), as well as being the northern home of the St George Illawarra Dragons, which is half-based in Wollongong.

Sydney has a local club rugby union competition (the Shute Shield), and a Super Rugby team the NSW Waratahs, who play their games in the city and represent the entire state of New South Wales. They were represented in the defunct Australian Rugby Championship by Sydney Fleet, Western Sydney Rams and Central Coast Rays. The National Rugby Championship has four NSW teams: Sydney Stars, Greater Sydney Rams, North Harbour Rays and NSW Country Eagles. The Australian Rugby Union headquarters are located in Sydney. The Waratahs play out of the Sydney Football Stadium, and when in Sydney the Wallabies play out of Stadium Australia.

Australian rules football

Australian rules football, commonly known as Australian Football League (AFL), is a developing game in most of NSW with increasing popularity. In Sydney, local competitions established in 1880 and again in 1903 competed with rugby union football and then rugby league football.

The AFL has two teams from Sydney, the Sydney Swans and the Greater Western Sydney Giants. Formerly South Melbourne, the Swans moved up to Sydney in 1982, after hitting financial trouble. The Swans have won two premierships since moving to Sydney (in 2005 and 2012). Attendance for Swans matches has slowly risen since their relocation. The Giants, based in Western Sydney and Canberra, joined the AFL in 2012. The inaugural AFL Women's in 2017 included a GWS Giants team.

Soccer

Whilst having a strong sporting tradition in the field of Rugby League, Sydney also has a long and strong tradition in association football. Early football clubs in Sydney were relatively small, and did not have very large followings, and like the general population of Sydney in the late 1800s the clubs were largely English in nature, but when the Australian government began its immigration policy in years closely following World War II, many immigrants left Europe in search of new homes in Sydney, and Australia in general. These migrant groups who were subject to racism from the existing population took it upon themselves to found their own football clubs, celebrating their particular ethnic communities.

The three largest such clubs were founded by the three largest post war immigration groups respectively, they are: Marconi Stallions Football Club (Italian), Sydney Olympic Football Club (Greek), and Sydney United Football Club (Croatian). Along with these larger clubs, there are also many smaller clubs formed by ethnic groups, who also bare suburban names, such as Bankstown City Lions Football Club (Macedonian), Bonnyrigg White Eagles (Serbian), Parramatta Eagles (Maltese), and St. George Saints Football Club (Hungarian). These "ethnic" clubs soon began to dominate football in Sydney, drawing large crowd support from their given ethnic groups, and having their fair share of on field success too.

In 2005, a new club was founded in Sydney called Sydney FC, who were to be based in central Sydney as opposed to being based at a small suburban stadium, and were founded specifically to attract a multicultural following. They were entered in a new league to be known as the A-League, this would act as the show piece national football competition, contested by similarly formed clubs from other large cities around Australia. In the first 6 years of their existence, Sydney FC have been relatively successful building up a solid support base of around 10,000 members, and sometimes attracting crowds of up to 40,000.

Cricket
The NSW Blues are by far the most successful domestic cricket side in Australia having won the First-class competition 44 times and the One-Day Domestic cup nine times. They occasionally play first-class matches against touring International sides. The team's main home ground is the Sydney Cricket Ground. In the Twenty20 Big Bash League and Women's Big Bash League, the state is represented by the Sydney Sixers, playing at the Sydney Cricket Ground and the Sydney Thunder, playing at the Sydney Showground.

Basketball and netball
The Sydney Kings and Wollongong Hawks are the state's representatives in the National Basketball League (NBL). These teams have all featured in the finals series since 2002–03, the Kings winning 3 consecutive premierships in 2002–03, 2003–04 & 2004–05. There are 12 teams in the New South Wales conference of the Australian Basketball Association, the Waratah League. The Sydney Uni Flames play in the Women's National Basketball League. Giants Netball were formed when the Greater Western Sydney Giants football club were given one of the three licenses for new teams for the first season of the Super Netball league in 2017.

 Communities and subcultures 

 Multicultural communities 
Areas with a large proportion of people born overseas and with non-English speaking backgrounds include Auburn, Fairfield, Liverpool, and Bankstown. Generally Western European and North American born people have settled around the Lower North Shore, eastern suburbs and Sutherland Shire, the Portuguese in Surry Hills, Arab people around the Lakemba-Auburn region, Indo-Chinese in the south-western suburbs, South Asians around Parramatta and the south east, and North East Asians in major nodes such as Hurstville, Burwood, Strathfield, Chatswood, Eastwood, Campsie and Haymarket.

 LGBT community 

Sydney has a significant gay and lesbian community, centred on Oxford Street, and holds the annual 
The Sydney lesbian community, though still active around Oxford Street, is well established and visible in Newtown and Enmore in Sydney's Inner West. There is also a history of lesbian community congregating in Leichhardt, and other inner west suburbs.

There are two magazines available in Sydney and one website with detailed information on Sydney's lesbian community and night-life.  LOTL and Cherry magazines are free, monthly, Australia wide, publications which can be found around Oxford Street, Glebe and Newtown. The Sapphic Sydney website was a resource which detailed events and community groups as well as featuring a local business directory.

There is also a thriving independent queer publishing community in Sydney publishing magazines such as Slit, Dirty Queer, and Spunk''.

See also 
 Architecture of Sydney
 Culture of Melbourne
 Culture of Auckland

References

External links 

 Sapphic Sydney – The Lesbian Guide to Sydney
 Arts and Cultural Attractions in Sydney